John Dewhurst (15 December 1876 – 1924) was an English professional footballer who made over 360 appearances in the Football League for Bury, Blackburn Rovers and Darwen as a wing half or centre forward. He also played non-League football for Padiham, Brentford, Accrington Stanley and Morecambe.

Personal life 
After retiring from football, Dewhurst worked as a cotton mill overlooker, a publican and a farmer.

Career statistics

Honours 
Blackburn Rovers

 Lancashire Senior Cup: 1901–02

References 

English footballers
Sportspeople from Jarrow
Footballers from Tyne and Wear
Brentford F.C. players
English Football League players
Southern Football League players
1876 births
Association football wing halves
Association football forwards
Padiham F.C. players
Darwen F.C. players
Blackburn Rovers F.C. players
Bury F.C. players
Accrington Stanley F.C. (1891) players
Morecambe F.C. players
1924 deaths
Nelson F.C. players